This is a list of fictional characters from DC Comics who are enemies of Green Arrow.

Central rogues' gallery

Foes of lesser renown
In alphabetical order (with issue and date of first appearance)

See also 
List of Batman Family enemies
List of Superman enemies
List of Wonder Woman enemies
List of Flash enemies
List of Green Lantern enemies
List of Marvel Family enemies
List of Aquaman enemies

Enemies
 
Lists of DC Comics characters
Lists of DC Comics supervillains